Da capo is a musical term.
Da Capo may also refer to:

Music
 Da capo aria, a musical form prevalent in the Baroque era
 Da Capo (Ace of Base album), 2002, or the title song
 Da Capo (Love album), 1966
 Da Capo (Toy album), 2014
 Da Capo (EP), 2020, by April 
 Dacapo Records, Danish classical music record label
 Da Capo (DJ), South African DJ and music producer

Visual novels
 Da Capo (visual novel), 2002
 Da Capo II, 2006
 Da Capo III, 2012
 Da Capo 4, 2019

Other uses
 Da Capo Press, an American book publisher
 Da Capo (1985 film), directed by Pirjo Honkasalo and Pekka Lehto
 Da-Capo, a chocolate bar produced by Fazer

See also

 
 
 Capo (disambiguation)
 Da (disambiguation)